The yellow-chevroned parakeet (Brotogeris chiriri) is native to tropical South America south of the Amazon River  basin from central Brazil to southern Bolivia, Paraguay, and northern Argentina. Caged birds have been released in some areas, and the birds have established self-sustaining populations in the  Miami, Florida, and Los Angeles and San Francisco, California. This bird seems to be doing better in its North American feral population than the closely related  white-winged parakeet. The species is also established in the downtown area of Rio de Janeiro, Brazil; and in Buenos Aires, Argentina; where it was introduced. The native population in South America continues to do well.

Description 
The bird is 20–25 cm in length, and is mostly light green in color. It has a trailing yellow edge on its folded wings, which is also seen when the bird is in flight.  It  was considered conspecific with the  white-winged parakeet until 1997.

Diet 
The bird feeds mostly on seeds and fruit in its native habitat, and feral populations have adapted to take in blossoms and nectar.  During dry periods, which often leads to fruit scarcity, the bird adapts by eating more seeds, particularly from the plant Erythrina dominguezii.  These birds are also observed participating in Geophagia, being the deliberate ingestion of soil, commonly in location of clay licks. Feral birds also come to bird feeders.  Wild birds primarily use disturbed forest and forest clearings around settlements.  They rarely use deep tropical forest.

Yellow-chevroned parakeets usually find holes in trees for nesting.  They also form nesting tunnels in dead palm fronds.  The female lays four to five eggs.  After raising their young, all birds form rather large communal roosts until the next breeding season.

Gallery

References

Further reading
 "National Geographic"  Field Guide to the Birds of North America 
Handbook of the Birds of the World Vol 4,  Josep del Hoyo editor, 
"National Audubon Society" The Sibley Guide to Birds, by David Allen Sibley,

External links
Yellow-chevroned Parakeet videos on the Internet Bird Collection
Yellow-chevroned Parakeet photo gallery VIREO Photo-High Res--(Close-up)
Photo-High Res; Article chandra.as.utexas.edu

yellow-chevroned parakeet
Birds of the Cerrado
Birds of the Pantanal
Birds of Brazil
Birds of Bolivia
Birds of Paraguay
Feral parrots
yellow-chevroned parakeet
yellow-chevroned parakeet